The Programme for Belize is a private initiative, the first project undertaken in 1988. Financial and management assistance was generously given by the Massachusetts Audubon Society. After the project was identified and started, loans were provided by the Nature Conservancy and donations provided by the World Land Trust. The goal of the project was to purchase and protect tropical rainforests in Belize to prevent them from being sold and cleared to make way for ranching. The project (and also the Trust) was launched at the London Butterfly House in May 1989. The famous naturalists Gerald Durrell and his wife Lee Durrell were guests of honour, and also visited Belize in 1989 to help with in-situ conservation efforts there. The World Land Trust then initiated Friends of Belize to help raise funds to cover costs of continuing protection of the purchased lands, as well as to aid in-situ conservation efforts. Since 2006 World Land Trust has organised regular symposia for the decision-makers of their project partners, and in 2008 PfB hosted the event at their La Milpa ecolodge.  

The current executive director of Programme for Belize is Edilberto Romero.

Activities 
The Programme for Belize has established a protection programme of twelve rangers for the Rio Bravo Conservation and Management Area that protect three of the major entrances and patrol the boundaries of the reserve. The Rio Bravo area, roughly 4% of Belize's total land area, is 262,000 of tropical forest in the northern part of Belize and includes facilities for visitors and researchers. 

In April 2022, PfB received a grant of $150,000 from the environmental organization, Global Conservation, to support the protection and patrolling of the Greater Belize Maya Forest, which composes roughly 10% of the total land area of Belize. The Greater Belize Maya Forest conservation project is supported by numerous other conservation and environmental groups including the University of Belize's Environmental Research Institute, the Cornell Lab of Ornithology, and the Rainforest Trust, among others.

References

See also
 Conservation in Belize

Nature conservation in Belize
Environmental organisations based in Belize